Ward Creek is an unincorporated community in Bowie County, in the U.S. state of Texas. According to the Handbook of Texas, the community had a population of 164 in 2000. It is located within the Texarkana metropolitan area.

History
Ward Creek was named for a nearby creek of the same name. It started growing during the second half of the 19th century and had a church and several farms. The oldest grave in the community's cemetery dates back to 1879. There were two churches, several businesses, a sawmill, and several scattered houses in the 1930s. Its population was 164 from 1990 through 2000.

Geography

Education
Ward Creek had its own school from the second half of the 19th century to the 1930s. Today, Ward Creek is served by the Simms Independent School District.

References

Unincorporated communities in Bowie County, Texas
Unincorporated communities in Texas